Neverland is the second full-length studio album by South Korean boy band U-KISS, released on September 1, 2011. It is the first album to feature new members Hoon and AJ. The album's lead single, "Someday", was released digitally August 26, 2011. The album's second single, "Neverland", was released on September 1, 2011, on Mnet along with the rest of the album.  The album was released in the Philippines in 2012 under Universal Records (Philippines).

Background and development
The group worked in both Korea and Japan, and under an American producer, using top-notch facilities in Osaka, Japan. The album was released September 1, 2011.

The second single, "Neverland", was released on September 1 along with the other tracks from the album. "NEVERLAND", in contrast to the autotune trend, the vocals were recorded one by one. It was written by JD Relic, produced by conductor Ryan Jhun as well as Adam Kapit, and Korean lyrics were written by Misfit.

Songs with synthpop elements include "Baby Don't Cry", "Obsession", "Tell Me Y", "On the Floor" and "Top That", but the album is dominated mostly by ballads.

Music video
The official music video for "Neverland" was released on August 31, 2011, and was directed by Kim Eun-yoo for 12 Rounds Production.  The video starts with DJ Itae flipping a red disc, and ends with U-KISS forming a triangular position with Eli at the front, while "U-KISS NEVERLAND" appears on the top.

Promotion
The video for the song "Neverland" reached a total of 730,000 views just within 72 hours of release and reached a total of 1,000,000 views within the next two days. Promotional television appearances were done in early September.

U-KISS promoted the album on tour in six Asian countries.

Track listing

Chart performance 

The first single, "Someday" entered the Gaon Chart on August 21 after selling 1,629,879 digital downloads from August 21 to August 28. It climbed six spots in its second week on the chart from its debut at number 140. "Neverland" entered the chart at number 50 for garnering a total of 6,151,934 digital downloads and streams from August 28 to September 3, 2011. It peaked at number 37.  On September 12, "Someday" entered the Billboard Korea K-Pop Hot 100 at number 100 while "Neverland" occupied the number 58 position, the latter also placing as the tenth "Biggest Jumper" in the chart on the said week.

Album personnel
Credits for the album are as follows:

Recording
 U-KISS – artist, chorus
 Kevin Woo – lead vocals, vocals
 Shin Soohyun – main vocals, vocals
 Shin Dongho – vocals, rap
 Lee Kiseop – vocals, rap, composer
 Yeo Hoon Min – back vocals, vocals, composer
 Kim Jaeseop – vocals, rap, composer, lyric producer
 Kim Eli – vocals, rap
 Paran – chorus

Producers and composers
 Ryan Jhun – composer, producer, arranger
 Adam Kapit – composer, producer, arranger
 Misfit – lyric producer
 JD Relic – arranger, chorus
 Antwann Frost – arranger
 Denzil "DR" Remedios – composer, producer, arranger, chorus
 Ryan Jhun – mastering
 Jay Deasel – producer, arranger
 C-LUV (Groove Network) – lyric producer, chorus
 Kim Ji-hyang (김지향) – lyric producer
 June – lyric producer
 Gr8Moon – lyric producer
 &E – lyric producer, composer
 Bag Seong Cheo (S2 Revolution) – music producer
 Swin – music producer, composer, chorus
 Stay Tuned – composer, arranger
 Min Syeong-so – chorus

Guitar
 Tommy Kim
 Ham Jeon-ho

Release history

References

2011 albums
U-KISS albums
Korean-language albums